Legislative elections were held in Israel on 31 December 1973. Voter turnout was 78.6%. The election was postponed for two months because of the Yom Kippur War.

Parliament factions

The table below lists the parliamentary factions represented in the 7th Knesset.

Results

Aftermath

Golda Meir of the Alignment formed the sixteenth government on 10 March 1974, including the National Religious Party and the Independent Liberals in her coalition, with 22 ministers. Meir resigned on 11 April 1974 after the Agranat Commission had published its interim report on the Yom Kippur War.

The Alignment's Yitzhak Rabin formed the seventeenth government on 3 June 1974, including Ratz, the Independent Liberals, Progress and Development and the Arab List for Bedouins and Villagers. The new government had 19 ministers. The National Religious Party joined the coalition on 30 October and Ratz left on the 6 November, by which time there were 21 ministers.

The government resigned on 22 December 1976, after ministers of the National Religious Party were sacked because the party had abstained from voting on a motion of no confidence, which had been brought by Agudat Yisrael over a breach of the Sabbath on an Israeli Air Force base.

During the Knesset term there were several defections from parties; In 1975 Aryeh Eliav left the Alignment and merged with Ratz to form Ya'ad - Civil Rights Movement. The new party broke up the following year when Eliav and Marcia Freedman left to set up the Independent Socialist Faction, whilst Shulamit Aloni and Boaz Moav returned to Ratz. In 1975 Benjamin Halevi left Likud to sit as an independent, whilst Shmuel Tamir and Akiva Nof left Likud to form the Free Centre the following year. In 1977 Hillel Seidel defected from the Independent Liberals to Likud, whilst Mordechai Ben-Porat broke away from the Alignment and sat as an independent.

In February 1974 Progress and Development and the Arab List for Bedouins and Villagers merged into the Alignment (with which they were already associated), but both later broke away and then formed the United Arab List in 1977. In the build-up to the 1977 elections the Religious Torah Front broke up into Agudat Yisrael (three seats) and Poalei Agudat Yisrael in March 1977. On 10 April Mapam broke away from the Alignment, but rejoined it two days later.

References

External links
Historical overview of the Eighth Knesset Knesset
Election results Knesset

Israel
Legislative election
Legislative elections in Israel
December 1973 events in Asia
Israel